Idiot is a 2022 Indian Tamil-language parody comedy horror film directed by Rambhala and produced by Screen Scene Media Entertainment Pvt Ltd. The film stars Shiva and Nikki Galrani. The film was initially planned for release in theatres in September 2021 but was postponed due to COVID-19 pandemic. The film was finally released in theatres on 1 April 2022. The film is notable for Nikki Galrani who is making spoofs of Vikram. The film received mixed to negative reviews.

Plot 
A royal family is betrayed and tricked into suicide by two subordinates, Sethupathi and Senathipathi. The sole survivor is the family's infant son, whom Sethupathi wants to kill, but Senathipathi convinces him to spare.

Many decades later, Sethupathi's descendant Chinnarasu lives in a village. He is the son of Raasu Gounder, the incompetent head of the village panchayat, and his long-suffering wife Parimalam. The only son of the family, Chinnarasu is despised by his father, who dotes on his daughters. After Chinnarasu disobeys his father and competes in a kabadi game, he is thrown out of the house. Chinnarasu returns drunk and belligerent, and demands a share of his ancestral property from his father. Raasu Gounder spitefully gives him the deeds to the palace of the royal family Sethupathi had killed, a place where the family had been warned never to go to. While travelling there, Chinnarasu meets with an accident, becoming a delusional amnesiac.

Meanwhile, Senathipathi's son runs a psychiatric hospital named after Senathipathi. Senathipathi's granddaughter Sumitha works as a doctor at the hospital. After his accident, Chinnarasu is admitted to Sumitha's hospital, and given the name Paandi. As Paandi, he befriends fellow patient Burfi, and falls in love with Sumitha, who sees him only as a harmless, but delusional, patient

One day, Sumitha's father gives her a ring that had once belonged to her grandfather. After Sumitha's mother puts the ring on her finger while she is asleep, Sumitha is strangled at night by the ghosts of the royal family her grandfather helped to murder, until the ring slips off her finger. The next day, the ring is stolen from Sumitha's bag by the attendant of a sinister female patient, but is taken from her soon after by Paandi, who believes that the ring is an engagement ring Sumitha has bought for him. The ring is then confiscated from Paandi by a nurse, and then once again stolen, reaching the female patient. The female patient bargains with the ghosts, revealing herself to be a sorceress named Neelagandi. She tells them that she will help them take revenge against Sethupathi's and Senathipathi's descendants, in return for them helping her resurrect her dead lover by sacrificing Sumitha on the night of an eclipse.

Meanwhile, Thiru Don Sekar and his gang plan to kidnap Sumitha and demand ransom from her father. On the night of the eclipse, Paandi and Burfi hide in Sumitha's car in an attempt to smuggle themselves out of the hospital. When Sumitha leaves the hospital, Thiru Don and his gang successfully snatch her, but accidentally make their ransom demand to Paandi and Burfi, instead of Sumitha's father. They drop off an unconscious Sumitha for the ransom at the drop site, but are angered to find that the "ransom" is actually a pile of rubbish. When they return to look for Sumitha, they see her being kidnapped by Neelagandi's ghost army and taken to the royal family's palace, but believe the ghosts are another gang of kidnappers in disguise.

Thus, the paths of Neelagandi, the dead royal family, Paandi and Burfi and the kidnappers all coincide at the palace. The kidnappers' attempts to flee the palace are stymied when they realise that the ghosts truly dead, and hilarity ensues due to Paandi's and Burfi's delusions and lack of concern about the ghosts. Meanwhile, Raasu Gounder and Parimalam visit the palace and are offended by their son's refusal to acknowledge them. At the same time, Sumitha's father enlists a priest in order to help rescue her from the palace.

Upon their arrival, the dead king recognises Sumitha's father as his youngest son, and the family switches sides to rescue Sumitha. The priest sets up a ritual to protect Sumitha during the eclipse, but it is destroyed by Burfi, who misunderstands it as Paandi's wedding, to which he hadn't been invited. As Neelagandi begins the ritual, the priest empowers Paandi to fight against her evil powers, then tricks Neelagandi into believing that Paandi is the reincarnation of her dead lover. When Neelagandi embraces Paandi, the priest releases the soul of Neelagandi's lover, who is enraged by her apparent betrayal and kills her. The eclipse ends soon after, and Sumitha is rescued.

Cast

Production
The shooting of the film was started on 9 November 2020 with the majority of the portions in the first schedule was shot in Tenkasi and the remaining portions in Chennai. The final schedule was commenced in Pollachi by the end of December 2020. The team wrapped up shooting for the film in February 2021.

Release 
The trailer of the film was released on 25 April 2021. The film was initially planned for release in theatres on 17 September 2021, but got postponed due to unforeseen situations. The film was released in theatres on 1 April 2022.

Within one month after its theatrical release, the film had its television premiere on Kalaignar TV on 1 May 2022.

Reception 
Idiot received generally negative reviews from critics. Logesh Balachandran of The Times of India gave the film 2.0 out of 5 stars and said, "Right from the beginning, the film is not sure of its stance, swaying between spoof and comedy of errors... [making it] a tedious watch for viewers..." Navein Darshan of Cinema Express gave the film 1.5 out of 5 stars, and highlights the poor representation of mental illness in the film as a major issue, saying, "Scenes like these are highly insulting to both the LGBTQIA+ community and people suffering from mental illness." Indiagltiz gave the film's rating 2 out of 5 and wrote that "Go for this one if your expectations are low and if you dont have to be tickled to laugh."

However Maalai Malar  critic noted that " As usual, the story takes place in old bungalows that are suitable for ghost films, so there is not much interesting."

References

External links 
 

2020s Tamil-language films
Indian comedy horror films
Indian parody films
Films postponed due to the COVID-19 pandemic